The 1967 Canadian-American Challenge Cup was the second season of the Can-Am auto racing series.  It involved FIA Group 7 racing cars running two-hour sprint events.  It began September 3, 1967, and ended November 12, 1967, after six rounds.

The series was won by Bruce McLaren driving a McLaren M6A Chevrolet.

Schedule

Season results

Drivers Championship
Points are awarded to the top six finishers in each race in the order of 9-6-4-3-2-1.

References

 
 

 
Can-Am seasons
Can-Am